The British Coffee House was a coffeehouse at 27 Cockspur Street, London.

It is known to have existed in 1722, and was run in 1759 by a sister of John Douglas (bishop of Salisbury), and then by Mrs. Anderson, and was particularly popular with the Scottish. English coffeehouses in the 17th and 18th centuries acted as public meeting places. Ned Ward, the 18th century writer was a client to the coffeehouse.

It was rebuilt by Robert Adam in 1770, and was owned by David Hatton Morley, the father of Atkinson Morley.

References

Coffeehouses and cafés in the United Kingdom
1722 establishments in England
History of the City of Westminster
18th century in London
British companies established in 1722